The Waynesville Greek Revival Houses, at 5303 and 5323 Wilkerson Lane in Waynesville, Ohio, were listed on the National Register of Historic Places in 1979.

The listing consists of two Greek Revival houses:  the Jacob McKay House (also known as "Doric Hill") and the McClelland-Cook House.  The McKay house was built in 1848.

References

National Register of Historic Places in Warren County, Ohio
Greek Revival architecture in Ohio
Houses completed in 1848